About What You Know is the title of a debut album by Sheffield band Little Man Tate. It was released on both standard CD version, plus Limited Edition CD/DVD version, and a Limited Edition heavy yellow vinyl of which there were only 1000 copies. The album was released on 29 January 2007, one week after their single "Sexy In Latin". The album title is a reference to the tagline of the film Little Man Tate, to which the band owe their name.

Track listing
All songs written by Jon Windle and Edward 'Maz' Marriott.
 "Man I Hate Your Band"
 "European Lover"
 "Sexy in Latin"
 "This Must Be Love"
 "House Party at Boothy's"
 "Who Invented These Lists?"
 "Court Report"
 "Little Big Man"
 "3 Day Rule"
 "This Girl Isn't My Girlfriend"
 "Down on Marie"
 "What? What You Got?" (Hidden Track)

References

External links
 Little Man Tate official website

2007 debut albums
Little Man Tate (band) albums
V2 Records albums